Salvia thymoides is an evergreen perennial shrub native to a small region in Mexico on the border of Oaxaca and Puebla states, growing at elevations from  to . Its native habitat is cloud forest, with the mountains catching regular moisture in the form of fog and rain. The plant was named by the botanist George Bentham in 1833, with the specific epithet, thymoides, referring to the small leaves which resemble those of thyme. It has a limited use in horticulture, introduced in the 1980s.

Notes

thymoides
Flora of Mexico